The Timothy Morse House is a historic First Period house in West Newbury, Massachusetts. The 2.5-story wood-frame house was built in stages beginning in 1730. Even though Georgian styling and construction techniques were already taking hold at that time, this house was built in a typical First Period style. The first portion built was to the right of the (now central) chimney, and was followed at a later date by construction of the left side.  In the 20th century, one addition was added to the rear of the house, and a relatively modern sun porch addition was added to the right side. The west side front room features a Federal period fireplace.

The house was added to the National Register of Historic Places in 1990.

References

See also
List of the oldest buildings in Massachusetts
National Register of Historic Places listings in Essex County, Massachusetts

Houses completed in 1730
Houses in West Newbury, Massachusetts
Houses on the National Register of Historic Places in Essex County, Massachusetts